Brigadier General Herbert William Studd  (26 December 1870 – 8 August 1947) was an English first-class cricketer and soldier.

Cricketer
Studd was educated at Eton and Trinity College, Cambridge. He was a right-handed batsman. He made his first-class debut for Middlesex against the touring Australians in 1890. During the match Studd took his only first-class wicket, that of Jack Blackham. This match was to be Studd's only appearance for Middlesex.

Studd's next first-class appearance came in the same season for the Marylebone Cricket Club, playing two first-class matches against Cambridge University and Oxford University. Five years later Studd toured Ireland with the Marylebone Cricket Club, playing a single first-class match against Dublin University, during which he made his maiden first-class half century, scoring 71. This was Studd's final first-class match for the club. In Studd's three matches for the club he scored 132 runs at an average of 26.40, with a high score of 71.

In 1898 Studd joined Hampshire, making his debut for the club in the County Championship against Leicestershire, where on debut Studd made scores of 49 and 44. Studd's second first-class half century came later in the season against Sussex, where he scored 60 in Hampshire's first innings. Studd's final first-class match came against Warwickshire later in the 1898 season. In his five first-class matches for the county he scored 217 runs at an average of 31.00, with a high score of 60.

In his overall first-class career Studd scored 352 runs at an average of 27.07.

Soldier
Studd was commissioned into the Coldstream Guards as a second lieutenant on 25 July 1891, and promoted to lieutenant on 2 January 1897.

He served in South Africa through the Second Boer War 1899–1902; where he took part in operations in the Orange Free State (April to May 1900), the Transvaal (May to June 1900, July to November 1900) and Cape Colony; and was present at several major battles, including at Belmont, Enslin and Modder River (November 1899), Magersfontein (December 1899), Poplar Grove and Driefontein (March 1900), Diamond Hill (June 1900), Bergendal and Komatipoort (August 1900). For his services during the war, he was promoted to captain on 11 February 1900, and was awarded the Queen's and King's Medals, a mention in despatches and the Distinguished Service Order (DSO). Following the end of the war, he return to the United Kingdom in August 1902.

He passed the Staff College in 1905 and served as Deputy Assistant Adjutant-General, London District 1905–09 and as GSO2 at the War Office 1912–14. He served through the Great War, was severely wounded and mentioned in despatches, and was awarded the CMG, CB and numerous foreign orders. He was promoted to lieutenant-colonel, brevet colonel and temporary brigadier-general. During the war he first commanded 19th Reserve Brigade, then 180th Brigade. He was Chief of Staff of XI Corps 1916–17 and of the British Section of the Supreme War Council 1917–1919. He returned to England to command his regiment in 1919 and retired on account of ill-health caused by wounds in 1923, when he was granted the honorary full rank of brigadier-general.

Studd died at Bayswater, London, on 8 August 1947.

Family

Herbert Studd was a son of Edward Studd, a rich planter who, on returning from India, took the lease of Tedworth House, Tidworth, Wiltshire. In 1894 Herbert Studd married Mary Cole, née de Vere, granddaughter of Sir Aubrey de Vere, 2nd Baronet. She was widow of Major William Cole, 3rd Dragoon Guards (one of their sons was Horace de Vere Cole). They had two daughters. She died in 1930 and he remarried to Alice Maude Tullis.

Honours
Companion of The Most Honourable Order of the Bath (CB)
Companion of The Most Distinguished Order of St Michael and St George (CMG)
Distinguished Service Order (DSO)
Queen's South Africa Medal with six clasps
King's South Africa Medal with two clasps
Mention in Despatches (South African War)
Mention in Despatches (Great War) (twice)
Commander, Legion of Honour (France)
Officer, Order of Leopold (Belgium)
Croce di Guerra (Italy)
Commander, Order of the Crown of Italy
Distinguished Service Medal (U.S. Army)

References

External links
STUDD, Brig.-Gen. Herbert William, Who Was Who, A & C Black, 1920–2008; online edn, Oxford University Press, Dec 2007, retrieved 10 June 2012
Herbert Studd at Cricinfo
Herbert Studd at CricketArchive
Matches and detailed statistics for Herbert Studd

1870 births
1947 deaths
Graduates of the Staff College, Camberley
British Army brigadiers
Military personnel from Wiltshire
People from South Tidworth
People educated at Eton College
Alumni of Trinity College, Cambridge
English cricketers
Middlesex cricketers
Marylebone Cricket Club cricketers
Hampshire cricketers
Coldstream Guards officers
British Army personnel of the Second Boer War
British Army generals of World War I
Companions of the Order of the Bath
Companions of the Order of St Michael and St George
Companions of the Distinguished Service Order
Commandeurs of the Légion d'honneur
Recipients of the War Cross for Military Valor
Foreign recipients of the Distinguished Service Medal (United States)
Recipients of the Distinguished Service Medal (US Army)